Betting is a commune in the Moselle department in Grand Est in northeastern France.

Before 16 September 2005, Betting was known as Betting-lès-Saint-Avold.

Population

See also
 Communes of the Moselle department

References

External links
 

Communes of Moselle (department)